Kompally is one of the fastest growing residential areas of Hyderabad, India which is located in the Medchal–Malkajgiri District. Kompally is located adjacent to the National Highway 44. It has posh residential layouts filled with ample greenery. It is well connected to NH 7 towards Nagpur and Kompally is just 10 km from Paradise, Secunderabad.
Places of interest include Cine planet, Sim n Sam, Dola-ri-Dhani, etc.

References 

Neighbourhoods in Hyderabad, India